Bayo Omoboriowo (born May 13, 1987) is a Nigerian photojournalist and documentary photographer. He is the official photographer to President Muhammad Buhari.

Early life and education
Omoboriowo was born and raised in Mushin, Lagos.

He graduated with a BSc degree in pure and applied chemistry from the University of Lagos.

References

1987 births
Living people
University of Lagos alumni
Nigerian photographers
People from Lagos
Yoruba photographers
Nigerian photojournalists
Residents of Lagos